Lovebox or Love Box may refer to:

Lovebox Festival, an annual electronic music festival in London
Lovebox Dublin, a Dublin music festival in 2007 and 2008
Lovebox (Beni album), 2010
Lovebox (Groove Armada album), 2002

See also
"Love in a Box", a 1984 song by Sunnyboys